Robert of Berghes or de Glymes-Berghes (died 1564) was 87th Prince-bishop of Liège (1557–1563). He was forced to resign the see on 30 March 1563, due to insanity, and died in the course of the following year.

He was the grandson of John III of Glymes, son of Anthony of Glymes, and a brother of John IV of Glymes.

References

Further reading
 Camille Tihon, La Principauté et le Diocèse de Liège sous Robert de Bergues, 1557-1564 (Liège, 1923).

1564 deaths
16th-century Roman Catholic bishops in the Holy Roman Empire
Prince-Bishops of Liège
Glymes family